The Legislative Assembly of Santa Catarina is the unicameral legislature of Santa Catarina state in Brazil. It has 40 state deputies elected by proportional representation.

The Assembly was created on August 12, 1834, the first legislature had 20 deputies, until 1881 when it was increased to 22.

External links
Official website

Santa Catarina (state)
Santa Catarina